Colorado Glacier is a tributary glacier,  long, draining northeast from Michigan Plateau to enter Reedy Glacier between the Quartz Hills and the Eblen Hills. It was mapped by the United States Geological Survey from surveys and from U.S. Navy air photos, 1960–64, and named by the Advisory Committee on Antarctic Names for the University of Colorado at Boulder, which has sent a number of research personnel to Antarctica.

See also 
Pastor Peak

References 

Glaciers of Marie Byrd Land